KYHD is an FM Radio station licensed to Valliant, Oklahoma.  KYHD has a Classic country format and broadcasts on a frequency of 94.7 MHz.  The format is known as HD 94.7.

References

External links
Payne Radio Group Website

YHD (FM)
Radio stations established in 2014
2014 establishments in Oklahoma